The 1946 Georgia Bulldogs football team was an American football team that represented the University of Georgia in the Southeastern Conference (SEC) during the 1946 college football season. In their eighth year under head coach Wally Butts, the Bulldogs compiled a perfect 11–0 record, outscored opponents by a total of 392 to 110, and tied for the SEC championship.

The Bullldogs ranked second nationally in total offense  with an average of 394.6 yards per game. They also ranked second nationally in passing offense with an average of 173.7 passing yards per game.

The team played its home games at Sanford Stadium in Athens, Georgia.

Claim to national championship
In the final AP Poll released in early December, Georgia was ranked No. 3 with 1,294 points, behind No. 1 Notre Dame with 1,730-1/2 points and No. 2 Army with 1,659-1/2 points. After the final AP Poll was issued, the Bulldogs defeated No. 9 North Carolina, 20–10, in the 1947 Sugar Bowl. Neither Army nor Notre Dame played in a bowl game, and Georgia was the only one of the top three teams with an unblemished record. In later analyses, Georgia was recognized as the 1946 national champion under the Williamson System.

Key players and awards
At the end of the season, Georgia halfback Charley Trippi won the Maxwell Award as the best player in college football. He was also selected as the SEC Player of the Year, finished second in voting for the Heisman Trophy, and was a consensus first-team selection on the 1946 All-America college football team. Trippi ranked fourth nationally in total offense with 1,366 yards and eighth nationally in rushing with 744 yards.

Guard Herbert St. John was selected by the United Press (UP) and Associated Press (AP) as a first-team player on the 1946 All-SEC football team. Quarterback John Rauch received third-team All-SEC honors from the UP. Trippi and Rauch were both inducted into the College Football Hall of Fame.

Schedule

1947 NFL Draft

The 1947 NFL Draft was held on December 16, 1946. The following Bulldogs were selected.

References

Georgia
Georgia Bulldogs football seasons
College football national champions
Southeastern Conference football champion seasons
Sugar Bowl champion seasons
College football undefeated seasons
Georgia Bulldogs football